Wismut is a German name for Bismuth. It may also refer to:

 Wismut (company), an East German uranium mining company
 Wismut Industrial Union, a trade union
 BSG Wismut Gera, a football club in Gera, Thuringia
 BSG Wismut Aue, former name of football club FC Erzgebirge Aue